József Kristóffy (17 September 1857 – 29 March 1928) was a Hungarian politician, who served as Interior Minister for a year (1905–1906) in Géza Fejérváry's cabinet. Universal suffrage appeared as part of this cabinet's program. Kristóffy wanted to make a coalition with the Social-Democrat Party, which was the main opposition party in Hungary during the first years of the 20th century ("Kristóffy-Garami Pact"), but failed to do so.

References
 Magyar Életrajzi Lexikon

1857 births
1928 deaths
People from Makó
Hungarian Interior Ministers